Ebrahim Karimi (born March 6, 1986) is an Iranian footballer who plays for Mashhad in the Iran Premier League.

Club career
Karimi has played his entire career with Rah Ahan.

Club career statistics

International career

He made his debut against Mauritania in April 2012 under Carlos Queiroz.

References

1986 births
Living people
People from Ray, Iran
Persian Gulf Pro League players
Rah Ahan players
Iranian footballers
Iran international footballers
Association football central defenders